Mas Flow is the debut compilation album by reggaeton producers Luny Tunes. Along with Tego Calderón's El Abayarde, also released in 2003, Mas Flow was the first reggaeton album to meet a mass audience. In doing so, it introduced the world not only to the musical style itself in album format, but also to Luny Tunes, the production duo who would quickly become one of reggaeton's best known producers. The mixtape nature of Mas Flow helped introduce a host of notable reggaeton vocalists in the process, including Daddy Yankee, Don Omar, Tego Calderón, Wisin & Yandel, Héctor & Tito, Nicky Jam, Baby Ranks, Zion & Lennox, and others. The album's success led to the release of Mas Flow 2.

The album is considered a landmark in the history of recorded latin music and one of the most influential works in reggaeton.  The song structure and production style Luny Tunes implemented in "Mas Flow" would influence the production style of most modern reggaeton recordings.

Track list 

In 2007 Mas Flow Gold Edition was released with the same track listing.

Videos 
 Cae La Noche - Hector & Tito
 Aventura - Wisin & Yandel
 Métele Sazón - Tego Calderón
 Cojela Que Va Sin Jockey - Daddy Yankee
 Hay Algo En Ti - Zion & Lennox*Even thought Tito was in the song, but not in the video.
 Bailando Provocas - Trebol Clan
 Motívate Al Baile - Baby Ranks
 Tú Sabes - Plan B
 Busco Una Mujer - Las Guanábanas
 Quien Tiene Mas Flow - K-Mill

Chart performance

Mas Flow

Mas Flow: Platinum Edition

References 

Reggaeton compilation albums
2003 compilation albums
Noriega (producer) albums
Luny Tunes albums
Albums produced by Luny Tunes
Albums produced by Noriega